Victor Ertmanis is a Canadian character actor known for his roles in television, film, and theatre. Ertmanis is a regular performer at the Stratford Festival.

Filmography

Film

Television

References 

Canadian male film actors
Year of birth missing (living people)
Living people
Canadian male television actors
20th-century Canadian male actors
21st-century Canadian male actors